The Men's trap event took place on 28 and 29 July 2014 at the Barry Buddon Shooting Centre. There was a qualification to determine the final participants. The two rounds of qualification were held on 28 July and the last three rounds of qualification, the semifinals and the finals were held on 29 July.

Results

Qualification

Semifinals

QB: Qualified to Bronze

QG: Qualified to Gold

Finals

References

Shooting at the 2014 Commonwealth Games